Magic Workstation (or MWS) is a program created by Magi-Soft that assists in playing Magic: The Gathering and other card games over the Internet and maintains a searchable database of Magic cards.

Users of the free version of the game start with a card set taken from a might and magic mini game.

Program Interface
The program includes an option for players to create their own themes when playing. Themes typically change the look of the virtual desktop, card borders, text and sometimes avatars.

Limited Formats and Tournament Play

Magic Workstation features a built-in sealed deck generator.  However, this generator is flawed as players have no way of knowing whether the decks being played were indeed built from the randomly generated cardpool.  Thus sites which host MWS limited tournaments make players build their decks online, and use a security code which will change with any contents of the deck.  This precaution helps prevent any dishonest play in a limited game, so long as both players ensure that their opponent's code is valid.

See also

Magic: The Gathering Online
Apprentice (software)

External links
Official MWS site 
MWS Site Italian Mirror
MTGBr - All MWS Resources
Installation and Setup Guide
Magic Workstation Play Guide
Magic-League.com - Online Gaming League
Magi-Soft MWS Game Databases
Magi-Soft Community Releases/themes

Magic: The Gathering software